José Armando Bermúdez Pippa (12 November 1928 – 3 December 2014), known as Poppy Bermúdez, was an Argentine-born Dominican businessman and the third CEO of J. Armando Bermúdez & Co., C. por A. after José Armando and Domingo Octavio Bermúdez.

Early life
Born in Buenos Aires in 1928, he was the son of the Dominican businessman Aquiles Bermúdez Ramos (1901-1970) — the son of José Armando Bermúdez Rochet and Ana Luisa Ramos de Peña — and Pastora Luisa Pippa, an Italian Argentine woman. A few months after he was born, his family moved to Santiago de los Caballeros, Dominican Republic, where he lived the rest of his life.

Career
In 1968, Bermúdez founded Color Visión the first color television channel in the Dominican Republic and the third in Latin America.

Death
Poppy Bermúdez died on 3 December 2014 in Santiago de los Caballeros.

Notes

1928 births
2014 deaths
Dominican Republic people of Argentine descent
Dominican Republic people of French descent
Dominican Republic people of Italian descent
Dominican Republic people of Venezuelan descent
Dominican Republic people of Walloon descent
Argentine emigrants to the Dominican Republic
White Dominicans
20th-century Dominican Republic businesspeople